The TMA-2 is a rectangular plastic cased Yugoslavian minimum metal anti-tank blast mine. It is very similar in appearance and size to the PT-56, which it replaced. The mine consists of two sections, an upper ribbed pressure plate with two large circular fuze caps, and a lower base section containing the main charge and two primary fuze wells containing UANU-1 fuzes. A secondary fuze well is provided in the base of the mine for an anti-handling device.

Sufficient pressure causes the top pressure plate of the mine to collapse downwards, forcing one or both of the fuze's plungers into a friction sensitive explosive, triggering the main charge.

It is found in Angola, Bosnia, Croatia, Kosovo, and Namibia.

Specifications
 Length: 260 mm
 Width: 200 mm
 Height: 140 mm
 Weight: 7.5 kg
 Explosive content: 6.5 kg of TNT
 Operating pressure: 100 kg

References
 Jane's Mines and Mine Clearance 2005-2006 
 

Anti-tank mines
Land mines of Yugoslavia